Praya is a genus of marine invertebrates in the order Siphonophorae. They are colonial, but the colonies can superficially resemble jellyfish; although they appear to be a single organism, each specimen is actually a colony of Siphonophora. It contains the following species:

 Praya dubia (Quoy & Gaimard in de Blainville, 1830)
 Praya reticulata (Bigelow, 1911)

References
 

Prayidae
Hydrozoan genera
Bioluminescent cnidarians